John Tiptoft, 1st Earl of Worcester KG (8 May 1427 – 18 October 1470), was an English nobleman and scholar who served as Lord High Treasurer, Lord High Constable of England and Lord Deputy of Ireland. He was known as "the Butcher of England" to his Tudor detractors.

Life

Birth and education

Born at Eversden in 1427, he was the son of John Tiptoft, 1st Baron Tiptoft, and Joyce Cherleton, co-heiress of Edward Charleton, 5th Baron Cherleton. He was notable for his education, studying at University College at Oxford University from the ages of 13 to 16.

Through his father, he was a descendant of Charlemagne and through his mother he was a descendant of Llywelyn the Great and Henry III of England.

Marriages and children
He married thrice:
Cecily Neville, Duchess of Warwick, daughter of Richard Neville, 5th Earl of Salisbury, in 1449, by whom he had no issue. She died 28 July 1450.
Elizabeth Greyndour (d. 1452), daughter and sole heiress of Robert (d. 1443) of and Joan Greyndour of Clearwell, Gloucestershire. They had one son, John, who died the year of his birth, 1452.
Elizabeth Hopton (b. c. 1445, d. 22 June 1498), daughter of Sir Thomas Hopton and Eleanor Lucy; granddaughter of Sir Walter Hopton and widow of Sir Roger Corbet of Moreton Corbet (d. 8 June 1467). They married at Ludlow about September 1467, and received a pardon for marrying without a licence dated 9 May 1468. They had a son, Edward, who died unmarried in 1485.

Career
He enjoyed a brilliant early career. After being created Earl of Worcester on 16 July 1449, he was employed in a number of official posts, first as Lord High Treasurer (1452–1454) and then as Lord Deputy of Ireland (1456–1457). He then departed on a pilgrimage to the Holy Land in 1458, and returned by way of Italy, where he stayed for two years, studying at the University of Padua. There he gained a considerable reputation as a scholar of Latin.

He returned to England in 1461 and was received with favour by Edward IV, receiving the Order of the Garter and being appointed to a number of posts, including in 1461, Constable of the Tower of London for life and in 1463, Lord Steward of the Household. Most notably, as Lord High Constable (1462), he presided over trials which resulted in the attainders and executions of Lancastrians, an office which he carried out with exceptional cruelty, having them beheaded, quartered, and impaled. 

In 1464, he was appointed Chancellor of Ireland for life and, in 1467, he again became Lord Deputy of Ireland, and brought about the execution of Thomas FitzGerald, 7th Earl of Desmond. Tiptoft served again as Lord High Treasurer from 1462 to 1463, and 
again from July to October 1470. Tiptoft's tenure as Lord High Treasurer occurred during the Great Bullion Famine and the Great Slump in England.

Death
Upon the Readeption of Henry VI in 1470, Tiptoft was unable to escape with Edward IV and his supporters. He was captured by the Lancastrians and beheaded at the Tower of London, attainted and his title forfeited.  His last act was to ask the executioner to chop off his head with three blows, for the sake of the Trinity.

The title "2nd Earl of Worcester" was the only peerage restored to his minor son Edward, on 14 April 1471, although no regent is named. His son Edward died in 1485, while still a minor, and without issue. The titles thus became extinct on his death, or in abeyance between his aunts as co-heiresses.

Notes

Bibliography

1427 births
1470 deaths
Tiptoft
Knights of the Garter
Lord chancellors of Ireland
Lord High Treasurers of England
English Renaissance humanists
People executed under the Lancastrians
People of the Wars of the Roses
Executed English people
People executed under the Plantagenets by decapitation
Executions at the Tower of London